Edward Morrissey may refer to:

Edward Morrissey (director), film director in the United States
Edward Morrissey, former senior minister with the Living Enrichment Center
Ed Morrissey, columnist for The Week